The , also known as the 49 Euro Ticket, will be a subscription public transport ticket for  all local public transport, valid in the whole of Germany, that will cost 49 Euro per month. The Scholz government announced it as a permanent successor to the 9-Euro-Ticket. The German federation and the federal states will each be contributing 1.5 billion Euro to it.

The ticket will be valid on all local and regional buses, trams, metros, S-Bahn trains, and local and regional trains across the whole of Germany. It will not be valid on long distance coaches (including those operated by Flixbus) or on long distance trains (such as IC and ICE trains operated by Deutsche Bahn).

Unlike the 9-euro-ticket, the Deutschlandticket will only be available as a subscription, but this can be cancelled monthly. Its price is to be adjusted to inflation each year, although the 49 Euro price is intended to be fixed for at least the first two years of operation of the ticket.

At the end of November 2022, transport ministers reaffirmed the commitment to the monthly ticket for 49 euros and it is planned to start in April 2023, an earlier start already in January was considered too early for implementation. But there is still opposition from the local and regional transportation services like the Munich MVV that want more refunding from the federal and the state governments.

See also 

 Klimaticket in Austria
 365-Euro-Ticket in Vienna

References 

2022 in politics
Fare collection systems
Public transport in Germany
Scholz cabinet